Saedabad may refer to:
 Saedabad, Dehgolan
 Saedabad, Kamyaran